Xenosaurus  arboreus, the arboreal knob-scaled lizard, is a lizard found in Oaxaca of Mexico.

References

Xenosauridae
Reptiles described in 1965
Reptiles of Mexico